Dorin Alexandru Grigore (born 1 August 1985) is a Romanian bobsledder. He competed in the 2018 Winter Olympics.

References

1985 births
Living people
Bobsledders at the 2018 Winter Olympics
Romanian male bobsledders
Olympic bobsledders of Romania